Åse Svenheim Drivenes (born 3 January 1977) is a Norwegian documentary film director.

Life and career 
Drivenes is from Tromsø. She worked on assignment for Médecins sans frontières in 2008 at Mount Elgon in Kenya, documenting local people's accounts of attacks on civilians, for Atlas Alliansen, a foundation assisting people with disabilities, on Young Voices, documenting young people in Tanzania and Uganda, and as a director for the second season of the Norwegian documentary television series Thaifjord, shown in 2011, about Asian immigrant women married to Norwegian men. She has also worked with Mobilfilmene, a children's film workshop, and together with  started a project to provide children seeking asylum in Norway with the means to make their own films about their experiences.

Since 2017, she has been an associate professor at the Norwegian Film School in the special course on Creative Documentary Directing, which began in 2015.

Works 

Vår mann i Kirkenes (2010) 
The film is a commentary on globalisation and outsourcing; its protagonist, Hallgeir Henriksen, is the newspaper Finnmarkens sole employee in small-town Kirkenes, unhappy with the minutiae he must cover, until management brings in a younger journalist and he finds himself even more frustrated.

Jeg er Kuba (2014) 
Jeg er Kuba or I am Kuba, originally titled Around My Family Table, studies the impact on families in poor countries within the European Union when adults leave to work in service jobs in wealthy countries, from the perspective of two Polish children, Kuba and his younger brother Mikołaj. When the film begins, Kuba is 12, Mikołaj is 8, and their father is working in Scotland and their mother in Austria; Kuba objects to the responsibility and the boys later join their mother in Vienna. Drivenes followed the children for two and a half years.

At the 2015 Tromsø International Film Festival, the film won Tromsøpalmen, the prize for the best Nordic short or documentary film. It was shown on NRK television in March that year, and provoked discussion of the plight of Euro-orphans, children left alone or with elderly relatives because of the European market in migrant labour; it was also shown on Yle in Finland.

Maiko's Dance (2015) 
Maiko's Dance (also known as Maiko: Dancing Child) is Drivenes' first feature-length documentary. Drivenes followed her for four years. The film premièred at the Los Angeles Film Festival and had its Norwegian première at the Bergen International Film Festival; it was subsequently shown on NRK television. Drivenes' production company, Sent & Usent, released two other dance documentaries the same year.

Filmography 
 2006: Nattskift, Rester, www.anna.no (collaborations; shorts)
 2010: Vår mann i Kirkenes
 2013: Jeg er Kuba / I am Kuba
 2015: Maiko's Dance / Maiko: Dancing Child

References 

Living people
1977 births
Norwegian documentary film directors
Norwegian women film directors
People from Tromsø
Women documentary filmmakers